Centre Parroquial San Cristóbal is a Spanish football team based in Terrassa, Barcelona Province, in the autonomous community of Catalonia. Founded in 1957 it currently plays in Tercera División RFEF – Group 5, holding home matches at Municipal Ca n’Anglada, with a capacity of 1,500 spectators.

History 
The club was founded in 1957 by a group of people from the Parròquia de Ca n’Anglada neighbourhood in Terrassa, among them Emilio Ros Martínez, Jose Anton Amezcua, Juan Fita, Agustín Márquez and others. The following year CP San Cristóbal was registered in the Catalan Football Federation.

Season to season

5 seasons in Tercera División
1 season in Tercera División RFEF

Achievements
Copa Catalunya
Runners-up: 1987–88

References

Football clubs in Catalonia
1957 establishments in Spain
Association football clubs established in 1957
Sport in Terrassa